Gayl is a given name and a surname. Notable people with the name include:

 Gayl Jones (born 1949), African-American writer
 Gayl King (born 1963), Canadian darts player
 Wilhelm von Gayl (1879–1945), German politician
 Georg Freiherr von Gayl (1850–1927), German general

See also
 Gael (disambiguation)
 Gayle (disambiguation)
 Gale (disambiguation)
 Gail (disambiguation)